The 2019 Meeting International Mohammed VI d'Athlétisme de Rabat was the 12th edition of the annual outdoor track and field meeting in Rabat, Morocco. Held on 16 June at the Prince Moulay Abdellah Stadium, it was the sixth leg of the 2019 IAAF Diamond League – the highest level international track and field circuit. 21 events were held with 13 of them being point-earning Diamond League disciplines. The other events were held primarily for Moroccan nationals except for the men's 1500 m and 5000 m.

One of the highest quality events of the night was the women's 1500 m, won by world record holder Genzebe Dibaba in a meeting record and world leading time of 3:55.47, ahead of Sifan Hassan who record the fastest losing time in history of 3:55.93 which was also a Dutch record. Diamond League leader Gudaf Tsegay finished third in a personal best time of 3:57.40, with the next eight runners also setting personal bests, with the exception of seventh-place Jenny Simpson who recorded the last sub-4:00.00 time (3:59.83). National records were set by fourth-place Moroccan Rababe Arafi and sixth-place Ugandan Winnie Nanyondo, with times of 3:58.84 and 3:59.56 respectively. In other women's events, Sandi Morris and Yaimé Pérez set meeting records in the pole vault (4.82 m) and the discus throw (68.28 m) respectively. 

On the men's side of the competition, Fedrick Dacres, who already set the discus throw meeting record with a mark of 68.71 m in the second round, was initially disqualified in the third round for supposedly stepping outside the throwing ring; However, Dacres protested the ruling and requested that his throw be measured, which was determined to be 70.78 m. A review of the footage showed that Dacres had not stepped outside the ring, and he was given the win with his throw being a new world leading mark, Diamond League record, meeting record, Jamaican record, personal best, and the first over 70 m throw on the African continent. In the 110 m hurdles reigning Olympic and world champion Omar McLeod lead from the start with Sergey Shubenkov trailing until McLeod hit the last hurdle, which sent him crashing into Shubenkov who also lost his balance. Despite this, Shubenkov was able to finish first with a dive to the finish line, and was still able to match the meeting record of 13.12 seconds. Getnet Wale also won a close race in the 3000 m steeplechase with teammate Chala Beyo, finishing in a world leading time and Ethiopian record of 8:06.01.

Diamond League results
Athletes competing in the Diamond League disciplines earned extra compensation and points which went towards qualifying for one of two Diamond League finals (either Zürich or Brussels depending on the discipline). First place earned 8 points, with each step down in place earning one less point than the previous, until no points are awarded in 9th place or lower.

Men

Women

Non-Diamond League results

Men

Women

See also
2019 Weltklasse Zürich (first half of the Diamond League final)
2019 Memorial Van Damme (second half of the Diamond League final)

References

Results
Meeting International Mohammed VI d'Athlétisme RABAT. IAAF Diamond League (2019-06-16). Retrieved 2020-03-29.

External links
Official Diamond League Rabat website
Fedrick Dacres disqualified throw overturned, sets a new Diamond League Record in Rabat - IAAF 2019

Meeting International Mohammed VI d'Athlétisme de Rabat
Meeting International Mohammed VI d'Athlétisme de Rabat
Meeting International Mohammed VI d'Athlétisme de Rabat
Meeting International Mohammed VI d'Athlétisme de Rabatt